Gastrokine-1 is a protein that in humans is encoded by the GKN1 gene.

The protein encoded by this gene is found to be down-regulated in human gastric cancer tissue as compared to normal gastric mucosa.

References

Further reading